Yvonne Brosch is a German actor and director.

Filmography 
 1975: Der Brandner Kaspar und das ewig' Leben
 1976: Der verkaufte Großvater
 1977: Derrick
 1980: SOKO 5113
 1982: Büro, Büro
 1993: Rußige Zeiten
 1993: Forsthaus Falkenau
 2008: Ekkelins Knecht

References

External links

German film actresses
German theatre directors
German stage actresses
Living people
German television actresses
Year of birth missing (living people)